The Welsh Tract, also called the Welsh Barony, was a portion of the U.S. state of Pennsylvania settled largely by Welsh-speaking Quakers. It is located to the west of Philadelphia. The original settlers, led by John Roberts, negotiated with William Penn in 1684 to constitute the Tract as a separate county whose local government would use the Welsh language.  The Barony was never formally created, but the many Welsh settlers gave their communities Welsh names that survive today. A more successful attempt at setting up a Gwladfa (Welsh-speaking colony) occurred two centuries later, in the Chubut Province of Patagonia, Argentina.

History

In the late 17th century, there was significant Welsh immigration to Pennsylvania for religious and cultural reasons. In about 1681, a group of Welsh Quakers met with William Penn to secure a grant of land in which they could conduct their affairs in their own language. The parties agreed on a tract covering 40,000 acres (160 km2), to be constituted as a separate county whose people and government could conduct their affairs in Welsh.

Whereas divers considerable persons among ye Welsh Friends have requested me yt all ye Lands Purchased of me by those of North Wales and South Wales, together with ye adjacent counties to ym, as Haverfordshire, Shropshire and Cheshire, about fourty thousand acres, may be layd out contiguously as one Barony, alledging yt ye number  come and suddenly to come, are such as will be capable of planting ye same much wth in ye proportion allowed by ye custom of ye country, & so not lye in large useless vacancies. And because I am inclined and determined to agree and favor ym wth any reasonable Conveniency and priviledge: I do hereby charge thee and strictly require thee to lay out ye sd tract of Land in as uniform a manner as conveniently may be, upon ye west side of Skoolkill river, running three miles upon ye same, & two miles backward, & then extend ye parallel wth ye river six miles and to run westwardly so far as this ye sd quantity of land be Compleatly surveyed unto you.—Given at Pennsbury, ye 13th Ist mo. [March] 1684.

TRANSCRIPTION: The "y" is the old letter "thorn". It is read as "TH."

The Welsh Tract's boundaries were established in 1687, but notwithstanding the prior agreement, by the 1690s the land had already been partitioned among different counties, despite appeals from the Welsh settlers, and the Tract never gained self-government.

The Roberts and other Welsh families became influential in the area, through the building of mills and the eventual introduction of the railroad. It is the railroad that gives the best-known part of the area its current name, the Philadelphia Main Line, named after the mainline of the Pennsylvania Railroad, portions of which were absorbed into Conrail in 1976 (with Amtrak operating intercity passenger rail service from 1971, SEPTA operating commuter rail service from 1983, and Norfolk Southern acquiring Conrail's freight operations in 1997) as one of the principal rail lines running between Chicago, IL and the Eastern seaboard. After the American Civil War, 104 Welsh families from this region migrated to Knoxville, Tennessee, establishing a strong Welsh presence there.

As suburbanization spread westward from Philadelphia in the late 19th century (thanks to the railroads), living in a community with a Welsh name acquired a cachet.  Some communities in the area formerly comprising the Welsh Tract were subsequently given Welsh or Welsh-sounding names to improve their perceived desirability.  Among these were Gladwyne, formerly "Merion Square" (which was given its new name in 1891, although the name is meaningless in Welsh), and Bryn Mawr, formerly "Humphreysville" (which was renamed in 1869).

Today
The area is now part of Montgomery, Chester, and Delaware counties. Many towns in the area still bear Welsh names. Some, such as North Wales, Lower Gwynedd, Upper Gwynedd, Lower Merion, Upper Merion, Narberth,
Bala Cynwyd, Radnor, Berwyn, and Haverford Township, are named after places in Wales. Others, such as Tredyffrin and Uwchlan have independent Welsh names.

It made up the modern Pencader Hundred, Delaware, and some of Cecil County, Maryland.

See also 
 Cambria, Pennsylvania
 Churchtown, Pennsylvania, settled by Welsh adherents of the Church of England
 History of Pennsylvania
 Welsh American

Further reading

References

External links
 A history of the Tract
 A briefer history
 Photograph of the indenture creating the Tract

Former regions and territories of the United States
Pre-statehood history of Pennsylvania
Philadelphia Main Line
Welsh-American history
Welsh emigration
Welsh-American culture in Pennsylvania
+
Regions of Pennsylvania
Radnor Township, Delaware County, Pennsylvania